Afrixalus orophilus is a species of frog in the family Hyperoliidae. It is found in Kivu in the eastern Democratic Republic of the Congo, Burundi, Rwanda, and southwestern Uganda. Common names Kivu banana frog, montane spiny reed frog, and two-lined leaf-gluing frog has been coined for it.

Description
Adult males measure  and adult females  in snout–vent length. The dorsum has narrow stripes on lighter background (but showing little contrast to the ground colour) that converge on the head as well as posteriorly.

Habitat and conservation

Knowledge on the population status of this species is sketchy; there are some recent records, but it has not been found again at its type locality, despite recent surveys. It is probably impacted by ongoing loss of habitat caused by agriculture and human settlements. Also pet trade and mining could be threats. It is present in the Bwindi National Park in Uganda and in the Virunga National Park in the Democratic Republic of Congo, although presently the latter is not effectively managed.

References 

orophilus
Frogs of Africa
Amphibians of Burundi
Amphibians of the Democratic Republic of the Congo
Amphibians of Rwanda
Amphibians of Uganda
Taxa named by Raymond Laurent
Amphibians described in 1947
Taxonomy articles created by Polbot